Ira Augustus Hunt Jr. (born July 23, 1924) is a retired United States Army Major General.

Early life and education

Military career
He attended the United States Military Academy graduating in the class of 1945. He was assigned to the Corps of Engineers upon graduation. He served as a commander of the 12th Engineer Battalion, 8th Infantry Division in West Germany from 1964 to 1966. He later served as a Military Assistant in the Office of Organization and Management Planning, Office of the Secretary of Defense.

During the Vietnam War he served as Chief of Staff of the 9th Infantry Division under Major General Julian Ewell. He subsequently served as commander of the 1st Brigade, 9th Infantry Division.

He served as deputy commander of United States Support Activities Group from 1973-4 and served temporarily as Defense Attaché at the Defense Attaché Office, Saigon during a change of command in August 1974.

He served as Deputy Chief of Staff for Training and Schools, Headquarters, United States Army Training and Doctrine Command, Fort Monroe, Virginia.

He retired from the Army in 1978.

Later life
He is the author of several books on the Vietnam War:
Sharpening the combat edge: The use of analysis to reinforce military judgment (1974) with LTG Julian Ewell 
The 9th Infantry Division in Vietnam: Unparalleled and Unequaled (2010) 
Losing Vietnam: How America Abandoned Southeast Asia (2013) 
My Lai Cover-Up Deceit and Incompetence (2018)

Decorations
His decorations include the Silver Star (2), the Legion of Merit (4), the Distinguished Flying Cross and the Distinguished Service Medal (2).

References

United States Army generals
United States Military Academy alumni
United States Army personnel of the Vietnam War
Living people
1924 births
American expatriates in Germany